Half a Crown is a science fiction novel written by Jo Walton published by Tor Books. It was first published on September 30, 2008. The first "Small Change" novel, Farthing, was released in August 2006. The second novel in the trilogy, Ha'penny, was released in October 2007.

Plot summary
The book is a thriller set inside an alternate history in which the United Kingdom made peace with Adolf Hitler, and the United States did not become involved in World War II. The British government has become fascist and authoritarian. Peter Carmichael, formerly a police inspector at Scotland Yard, is now head of the secret police, called "The Watch". He must deal with political intrigue by those jealous of his position and must safeguard his teenage ward while he keeps secret his illicit activities helping Jews and dissidents who wish to flee the country.

Reception
Publishers Weekly was mixed in its review by commenting, "Walton's understated prose and deft characterizations elevate this above similar works such as Fatherland and SS-GB. Some readers, though, may feel let down by an optimistic ending that jars with the series' overall downbeat tone".

Awards and nominations
Half a Crown was a finalist for the 2009 Prometheus Award.

Publication history
2008, USA, Tor Books  Pub date 30 September 2008, Hardback

See also

Axis victory in World War II, regarding works of Nazi Germany/Axis/World War II alternate history

Notes

External links
Tor-Forge Books official website

2008 British novels
Novels by Jo Walton
Novels about World War II alternate histories
2008 science fiction novels
Tor Books books
2008 Canadian novels
British alternative history novels
Canadian alternative history novels